Lavaufranche is a commune in the Creuse department in the Nouvelle-Aquitaine region in central France.

Geography
The Petite Creuse river flows through the commune, which is also served by a TER railway.

Population

Sights
 The commanderie of the Knights of Saint John, dating from the twelfth century.
 The twelfth-century chapel.

See also
Communes of the Creuse department

References

Communes of Creuse